An American Son: A Memoir is a 2012 autobiography by Florida Senator Marco Rubio. The first half of the book is his life story, including his family history of emigration from Cuba. The second half is all about the 2010 Senate electoral race against Governor Charlie Crist.

References

2012 non-fiction books
American autobiographies
Marco Rubio
Sentinel (publisher) books